See Boreum for namesakes

Boreum was a city and diocese in Roman Libya. It is now a Roman Catholic titular see.

Its modern location is Tabibbi, in southern modern Libya.

History 
Boreum was important enough in the Roman province of Libya Superior (Libya Pentapolitana; part of Cyrenaica) to become one of the suffragan sees in this province, which depended directly on the Patriarchate of Alexandria (in Egypt) without a proper Metropolitan, but faded like most bishoprics in Roman Africa. Only one ancient bishop is known, the Arian bishop Senziano, mentioned in 325.

Titular see 
In 1933 the diocese was nominally restored as a Latin titular bishopric of Boreum (Latin) / Borien(sis) (Latin adjective) / Boreo (Curiate Italian).

It is vacant, having had only these incumbents, all of the fitting Episcopal (lowest) rank:
 Louis-Joseph-Ephrem Groshenry, Society of African Missions [S.M.A.) (1937.06.17 – death 1962.05.18) as first Apostolic Vicar of Bobo-Dioulasso (Burkina Faso, then French Upper Volta) (1937.06.17 – 1941.05.15) and as emeritate
 Sinforiano Lucas Rojo, Missionary Oblates of Mary Immaculate (O.M.I.) (1962.08.24 – death 1990.05.04) as Apostolic Vicar of Pilcomayo (Paraguay) (1962.08.24 – 1981.01.24) and as emeritate.

See also 
 List of Catholic dioceses in Libya

References

Sources and external links 
 GCatholic - data for all sections

Catholic titular sees in Africa
Former Roman Catholic dioceses in Africa